A lag-na, or na, is an ancient Tibetan frame drum. The drumhead has a minimum diameter of about one metre. Like the dhyāngro (the principal drum of the jhakri shamans of Nepal), the lag-na has a carved, wooden handle. One plays the na by striking its drumhead with a heavy percussion mallet.

See also
 Damaru, a small, two-headed drum of Hindu and Tibetan Buddhist tradition

References

Drums
Medicine drums
Tibetan musical instruments